Beaver Township, Arkansas may refer to:

 Beaver Township, Carroll County, Arkansas
 Beaver Township, Saline County, Arkansas

See also 
 List of townships in Arkansas
 Beaver Township (disambiguation)

Arkansas township disambiguation pages